Sophy Rickett (born 22 September 1970) is a visual artist, working with photography and video/sound installation. She lives and works in London.

Career

Sophy Rickett was born in London. Between 1990 and 1993, she studied for a BA (Hons) in Photography at London College of Printing, London. Her work came to prominence in the late 1990s, following her graduation from The Royal College of Art, London in the Summer of 1999.

One of her earliest works, Vauxhall Bridge, depicted Rickett urinating standing up while attired in expensive feminine clothes, against the backdrop of Terry Farrell's iconic SIS building at Vauxhall Cross. It was reviewed in Creative Camera magazine in 1996. Some people saw the "Pissing Women" series as a satire of male behaviour, though many did not know the women were genuinely urinating. Sophy Rickett stated in the interview "this was something I did," and the photographs were not manipulated.

Rickett's photographic work explores the competing forces of light and darkness in defining and articulating space, often using photography as a way of exploring the distinction between seeing and looking. She is interested in the tension between the abstract possibilities and narrative tendencies of photography, film, and video. Her photographs are made mainly at night, and often in peripheral or mundane environments. In both colour and black and white, they cohere around strong formal properties, and are often minimal in character. While playing on the latent narrative possibilities of place, her work demonstrates the potential of photography to conceal as much as reveal.

Rickett has also made several books, most recently - "The Death of a Beautiful Subject", GOST books 2015, and "THE CURIOUS MOANING OF KENFIG BURROWS", 2019.

Auditorium and To The River
Like her photography, Rickett's video work has a strong conceptual element. Her first major film installation, Auditorium (2007), was a response to the architecture of Glyndebourne Opera House. It explores the material reality of an industrial space that exists to create illusions. More than 70 hours of footage shot over 10 days were pared down to a 20-minute film with a score by British composer Ed Hughes. Nicolass Till, who writes frequently on the opera, says that it presents the stage as "a space of revelation that at the same time implies a concealed other."

To The River (2011) is a multi-screen video installation with 12 channels of sound. Filmed during the spring equinox of 2010 on the bank of the River Severn, To The River depicts small crowds of people gathered to wait for the Severn bore to pass. Filming was done mainly at night. The video installation consists of three screens set at different points in a gallery, two on separate walls, and one spanning a corner. Surround sound from the audio tracks was played at several points in the ceiling. The audio captured fragments of conversations between the spectators waiting for the river to rise, "a collection of very human stories that touch upon mistakes, failure, desire, loss, ambivalence and resentment... a prolonged encounter with the momentary reversal in the flow of things."

Auditorium was commissioned by Photoworks and Glyndebourne Opera, and To The River was commissioned by film producer Elena Hill in partnership with Arnolfini and ArtSway. Both projects were supported by grants, and both resulted in publications, from Photoworks and Arnolfini.

Exhibitions
Selected solo shows include:
L'Art Se Donne En Spectacle, Chateau de Lichtenbert, Alsace, France (2013) 
Ffotogallery, Cardiff (2008)
De La Warr Pavilion, Bexhill on Sea (2007)
nichido contemporary art, Tokyo, Japan (2003, 2009)
Centre pour L’image Contemporain Saint-Gervais, Geneva, Switzerland (2003)
Alberto Peola, Turin, Italy (2002, 2004)
Emily Tsingou, London (1999, 2001, 2003, 2005)

Selected group exhibitions include:
 Portrait/Landscape: Genre Boundaries, Moscow Museum of Modern Art, Moscow (2012)
In Our World. New Photography in Britain, Galleria Civica, Modena, Italy (2008)
Night, Royal West of England Academy, Bath, UK (2008)
Les Peintres de la Vie Moderne, Centre Pompidou, Paris, France (2007)
Fotografierte Landschaften, Museum der bildenden Künste, Leipzig, Germany (2007)
Order and Chaos, Fotomuseum Winterthur, Winterthur, Switzerland (2003)
Where are We?, Victoria & Albert Museum, London (2001)

Publications
Monographs

Anthologies and group exhibition catalogues

Awards and commissions
2012 – Artist Associate-ship, Institute of Astronomy, University of Cambridge, UK
2010 – Recipient of AHRC Practice Led Research Grant
2009 – Winner of Icona 09, Verona Art Fair, Verona, Italy
2008 – Recipient of Development Grant, Film and Video Umbrella, UK
2003 – Recipient of Mont Blanc Cutting Edge Award to Artists
2002 – Fellowship at St John's College, Oxford
2002 – Arts Council of England, Helen Chadwick Fellowship, hosted by The British School at Rome / Ruskin School, Oxford
2000 – Fellowship at DCA, Dundee Contemporary Arts, Dundee, UK
1999 – BMW Financial Services Millennium Commission in collaboration with the Victoria and Albert Museum, London, UK

Public collections
Sophy Rickett's work is included in the following public collections.
Centre Georges Pompidou, Paris, France
Government Art Collection, UK
Musée des Beaux-Arts de Nantes, Nantes, France
Museum der bildenden Künste, Leipzig, Germany
Victoria and Albert Museum, London, UK

References

External links 
Official site
Ffotogallery Review of Auditorium and recent photoworks
nichido contemporary art galleries, biography, and reviews
Alberto Peola exhibition descriptions and galleries (in Italian)
Frieze magazine review of 2001 solo exhibition 
Comments by the artist on To The River

1970 births
Living people
British video artists
Women video artists
Photographers from London
Alumni of the Royal College of Art
Alumni of the London College of Communication
English women photographers
English contemporary artists
20th-century English women
20th-century English people
21st-century English women
21st-century English people